Chay Vdvoyom ( – Tea for Two) was a Russian pop music band, formed by Denis Klyaver and Stanislav Kostyushkin, which existed from 1994 until 2012. Among other accolades, the duo won several Golden Gramophone Awards for their performance.

Discography 
Albums
 2007 - Прости (Prosti; Sorry)
 2005 - Вечернее чаепитие (Vecherneye Chayepitie; Evening Tea Party)
 2004 - Утреннее чаепитие (Utrenneye Chayepitie; Morning Tea Party)
 2004 - 10 тысяч слов о любви (10 tysyach slov o lyubi; 10 Thousands Words About Love)
 2002 - Ласковая моя (Laskovaya moya; My Tender)
 2000 - Неродная (Nerodnaya''')
 1999 - Ради тебя (Radi tebya; For You)
 1998 - Попутчица (Poputchitsa; Fellow [female] traveler)
 1997 - Я не забуду (Ya ne zabudu; I don't Forget'')

Awards 

 2001: "Song of the Year" award (Песня года) for "Laskovaya Moya" ("Ласковая моя")
 2001: Golden Gramophone Award with "Laskovaya Moya" («Ласковая моя»)
 2002: Golden Gramophone Award with «Чтобы ты была моя»
 2002: "Song of the Year" award (Песня года) for "Сынок"
 2003: Golden Gramophone Award with «Желанная»
 2004: "Bomb of the Year", "100% Hit" (Бомба года, Стопудовый хит)
 2005: Golden Gramophone Award with «День рождения»
 2006: Golden Gramophone Award with «24 часа»
 2010: Golden Gramophone Award with «Белое платье»

References

External links

 Official website
 
 

Russian pop music groups
Musical groups established in 1994
Musical groups disestablished in 2012
Russian boy bands
Russian musical duos
1994 establishments in Russia